Christian Schack (14 April 1901 – 27 July 1958) was a Danish wrestler. He competed in two events at the 1932 Summer Olympics.

References

External links
 

1901 births
1958 deaths
Danish male sport wrestlers
Olympic wrestlers of Denmark
Wrestlers at the 1932 Summer Olympics
Sportspeople from Aarhus